Walkeshwar (Pronunciation: [ʋaːɭkeʃʋəɾ]) is an affluent area in South Mumbai, India, at the north-western end of the Marine Drive loop. It has a large Gujarati population. It is mostly known for Walkeshwar Temple, Banganga Tank and Jain temples.

Etymology
Walkeshwar takes its name after Lord Shiva, one part of the Trinity of Hinduism. The modern form of the word derives from the Sanskrit word for an idol made of sand - Valuka Iswar, an avatar of Shiva - in a legend celebrated at the Walkeshwar Temple, situated at the highest point of the city.

Legend
Legend has it that Hindu god, Ram paused at that spot on his way from Ayodhya to Lanka in pursuit of the demon king, Ravana who had kidnapped his wife, Sita. Then Lord Rama was advised to worship Shiv linga and he is said to have constructed the original linga of sand, after getting tired of waiting for his brother, Lakshman to bring an idol. The name is etymologically derived from the Sanskrit word for an idol made of sand -- Valuka Iswar, an Avatar of Shiva.

As the story progresses, later when Ram was thirsty, as there was no fresh water readily available (only sea water), he shot an arrow and brought Ganges over here. Hence Bana (arrow in Sanskrit) Ganges.  The water that feeds the tank stems from an underground spring at that spot, despite its proximity to the sea.

Overview
Walkeshwar also includes Malabar Hill, and is in close proximity to the Hanging Gardens. Raj Bhavan, the official residence of the governor of Maharashtra, has the maximum number of Gulmohur trees thus making a pretty site in the season is located here besides some of the most expensive neighborhoods in the whole country, prices ranging from Rs 92,000 to Rs 1,00,000 per square foot (approximately $US1656–1800 per square foot), which can be compared to residential luxury apartments in the US. It probably has the most expensive real estate in the whole of India. It has a lot of prime residential buildings in the area. The most of the buildings are sea facing and the location has lot of natural character. The sea is very calm here as it is the bay area. There is also a Jain temple, near the Malabar Hill Police Station.

Places of interest

Babu Amichand Panalal Adishwarji Jain Temple : Babu Amichand Panalal Adishwarji Jain Temple is one of the most visited Jain temple in Mumbai. This temple was built in 1904 and belongs Shwetambar sect of Jainism. This Jain temple is known for its old carving work, architectures, and paintings. This temple is dedicated to Adishwarji(Rishabhanatha), the first tirthankara of Jainism. Moolnayak of this temple is a white colored idol of Adishwarji. Idols of other tirthankaras, Jain deities like Goddess Padmavati, Ghantakaran Mahavir are present here. Temple also has an idol of Parshvayaksha the 'adhisthayak Dev' of lord Parshwanatha. Ceiling of the temple has carving of Navgraha, Yaksha and Yakshi. Thousand of Jains visit this temple daily. Chandanbala Jain Temple is also present near this temple.
Walkeshwar Temple also known as the Baan Ganga Temple, is a temple dedicated to the Hindu god, Shiva. The temple is close to Banganga Tank. The temple and the attached fresh water Banganga Tank were built in 1127 AD.
The Hanging Gardens or Pherozeshah Mehta Gardens, are terraced gardens perched at the top of Malabar Hill, on its western side, just opposite the Kamala Nehru Park. They provide sunset views over the Arabian Sea and feature numerous hedges carved into the shapes of animals. The park was laid out in 1881 by Ulhas Ghapokar over Bombay's main reservoir.
Banganga Tank is an ancient water tank which is part of the Walkeshwar Temple Complex in Malabar Hill area of Mumbai in India built in the 1127 AD.

Kamala Nehru Park - Named after Kamala Nehru, wife of Pt. Jawaharlal Nehru, Kamala Nehru Park is one of the oldest parks in Mumbai. Popular mostly among kids, this park is also known for a shoe-like-structure, called the Old Woman’s Shoe that has been inspired from the nursery rhyme & hence this park is also known as Shoe Park.

Gallery

See also
 Walkeshwar Temple
 Malabar Hill

References

External links

 Photos of Banganga Tank Walkeshwar

Neighbourhoods in Mumbai